Joseph Andrew Felmet (May 31, 1921 – 1994) was an American journalist, pacifist, and civil rights activist. He worked as a reporter for The Hartford Times and the Winston-Salem Journal. He participated in the Journey of Reconciliation in 1947, considered the precursor to the Freedom Riders.

Early life
Felmet was born on May 31, 1921, in Asheville, North Carolina. He attended Lee H. Edwards High School and delivered newspapers for The Asheville Times. He graduated from the University of North Carolina at Chapel Hill in 1942 with a bachelor's degree in journalism.

Civil rights, journalism, and politics
After graduating from college, Felmet worked as a reporter for the Asheville Advocate. In 1942, he was sent to a conscientious objector camp for failing to register with the Selective Service. He was released after agreeing to register with the Selective Service after spending six months in the camp, but in 1943, he was drafted to the United States Army and refused to report. Felmet was sentenced to one year and one day in prison, but was released after six months. After the war, he joined the United World Federalists. He registered with the Socialist Party of America. In 1946, he became secretary of the Workers' Defense League (WDL). He was sentenced to 15 days in jail in Fort Lauderdale, Florida, in February 1947 for not registering with the city prior to canvassing in African-American neighborhoods for the WDL.

In April 1947, Felmet participated in the Journey of Reconciliation, the precursor to the Freedom Riders, challenging racial segregation. Felmet, Bayard Rustin, Igal Roodenko, and Andrew Johnson were arrested in North Carolina for violating local Jim Crow laws regarding segregated seating on public transportation. They were sentenced to serve on a chain gang for 30 days. On June 17, 2022, Judge Allen Baddour, with full consent of the State and Defense, dismissed the charges against the four Freedom Riders, with members of the exonerees’ families in attendance.

Felmet worked as a reporter for The Hartford Times in the 1950s. He returned to North Carolina in 1955 when he accepted a job with the Winston-Salem Journal, where he worked in the editorial staff. Felmet retired from journalism in 1969.

He lost the primary election to Stephen L. Neal, receiving 5,141 votes to Neal's 28,379, and Neal went on to defeat Mizell. Felmet ran for the Democratic Party nomination for the United States Senate in the 1978 election. Luther H. Hodges Jr., who received 38% of the vote, and John Ingram, getting 26% of the vote, advanced to a runoff election.

Felmet delivered a petition to President Jimmy Carter and Governor Jim Hunt seeking a pardon on behalf of the Wilmington Ten. As a member of the War Resisters League, Felmet petitioned President Ronald Reagan to end the draft, which President Carter had reinstated during his administration. He was arrested on the campus of North Carolina State University for trespassing when he refused to stop circulating petitions. Felmet filed a brief with the court challenging the university's restrictions on outsiders communicating with students as a violation of his First Amendment rights. The university dropped the charges and agreed to review their policy. Felmet enrolled at Wake Forest University to study the Russian language, and petitioned the United States Information Agency for issues of Amerika, the Russian-language magazine published by the United States Department of State. They declined his request based on the Smith–Mundt Act, a 1948 anti-propaganda law that prohibits domestic distribution of its materials meant for foreign distribution.

Personal life
In 1952, it was reported that Felmet was engaged to Marianne Ryon of Stonington, Connecticut. It is not clear that the marriage took place.

It is known that on July 27, 1965, Felmet married widow Marjorie "Margie" Halpern (née Marjorie Spainhour Keiger). Her father, Joseph Lee Keiger, Sr. (1899-1956), founded Old Town Telephone System. Through a series of mergers, the company became part of what would be known as the telecommunications company Alltel, which along the way would provide substantial financial assets to Margie. Despite the monetary comfort her money brought to the couple, they lived in a modest house in Winston-Salem.

Margie was a talented piano player and teacher. She was a graduate of Hollins College and UNC Chapel Hill, with an MA from Eastman School of Music in Rochester, NY. She taught piano at Meredith College in the 1940s and later taught at Wake Forest University and gave private piano lessons in Winston-Salem.

Margie died on March 9, 1993, from a blood disorder.

After Margie's death, Felmet focused his attention on challenging his wife's will. Her estate was substantial primarily due to investments rooted in her father's founding of Old Town Telephone System. Although the will provided generous lifetime support for Felmet, his wife also intended for her siblings and their heirs to benefit from her father's achievements and pass that heritage on to them. Felmet insisted he was entitled to more than the will specified and was successful in gaining a notable portion of additional proceeds from her estate through legal action, thereby reducing the distribution of the family money to her siblings and their children. The settlement resulted in Felmet becoming a wealthy man.

Death
Felmet remained in the couple's modest home after his wife's death in 1993. He died in September 1994, but his exact date of death could not be determined. A family member who had been unable to reach Felmet went to his home on September 28 and called the police when no one answered the door. An officer discovered Felmet's body, allegedly in the bathtub.

Felmet's death certificate says he was pronounced dead on September 28, 1994, but the date of his death is listed as September 20, 1994, which is when he reportedly was last seen alive. The cause of death, ischemic heart disease, was later added to the death certificate after an autopsy was performed.

The October 20, 1994, edition of the Winston-Salem Chronicle simply mentioned that Felmet had died "recently". The Chronicle noted that prior to his death, Felmet had expressed he did not want a memorial service held for him after he died. Instead, it was his wish that mourners donate to the War Resisters League, the Fellowship of Reconciliation, or the Unitarian Church of Winston-Salem.

Felmet's fortune disappeared after his death.

References

1921 births
1994 deaths
Politicians from Asheville, North Carolina
North Carolina Democrats
University of North Carolina at Chapel Hill alumni
Wake Forest University alumni
Members of the Socialist Party of America
American conscientious objectors
Freedom Riders
Journalists from North Carolina